Thalictrum thalictroides, synonym Anemonella thalictroides, the rue-anemone, is a herbaceous perennial plant native to woodland in eastern North America. It has white or pink flowers surrounded by a whorl of leaflets, and it blooms in spring.

Description

The leaflets are widely rounded in shape and the ends are three lobed.

It flowers in spring, with flowers are borne singly or in umbel-like inflorescences with 3 to 6 flowers. The flowers have short stems that hold the fully opened flowers above the foliage. The involucral bracts have three leaflets like the leaves. The showy rounded flowers have 4-15 carpels surrounded by many yellow stamens in the middle, and a cup of 5 to 10 white to pinkish-lilac petal-like sepals.

The green achenes have 8 to 10 prominent veins and become dark brown when ripe.

Taxonomy

Originally described as Anemone thalictroides by Linnaeus in 1753, it was transferred to a new, monospecific genus, Anemonella, by Édouard Spach in 1839. Although similar to plants in the genus Thalictrum, Sprach considered the diminutive size, umbelliform inflorescence, and tuberous roots of this species to be distinctive enough to designate a new genus. Bernard Boivin considered this distinction suspect, and transferred the species to the genus Thalictrum in 1957. Molecular evidence supports the placement of the species within Thalictrum, and this placement is accepted by several modern treatments, although The Plant List retains it in Anemonella.

Similar species
The rue-anemone is often confused with the similar species, the false rue-anemone (Enemion biternatum). Both plants have white flowers that appear in early spring and grow in wooded areas. However, the false rue-anemone is more likely to be found in moist bottomlands and can form large colonies, while the rue-anemone grows singly on wooded slopes. Sometimes rue-anemone sepals are pale to dark pink, whereas false rue-anemone sepals are always white. The false rue-anemone holds its flowers in leaf axils, most often singly. In contrast, the flowers of a rue-anemone appear in a cluster above a whorl of leaf-like bracts, most often in groups of three to six. While false rue-anemones always have five sepals, rue-anemones can have five to ten sepals.  False rue-anemones have a small cluster of no more than six green carpels in the center of the flower, while rue-anemones sometimes have as many as fifteen. False rue-anemones usually have deep clefts in their leaves, while rue-anemones do not.

References

External links

 
 Thalictrum thalictroides on the Native Plant Identification Network (NPIN)
 Thalictrum thalictroides (Rue Anemone) page on Minnesota Wildflowers
 Thalictrum thalictroides page on Ontario Wildflowers
 Thalictrum thalictroides page in Michigan Flora
 Thalictrum thalictroides in Wildflowers of the United States

Flora of the Eastern United States
Flora of Canada
Plants described in 1753
Taxa named by Carl Linnaeus
thalictroides